Cinq-Cents or Cinq Cents may refer to:

 Council of Five Hundred, an 18th-century, lower house of the French parliamentary system
 Cinq Cents (card game), an ancestor of Bezique